Sewall is a surname. Notable people with the surname include:

 Arthur Sewall  (1835–1900), Shipbuilder and American Democratic politician from Maine
 Charles S. Sewall (1779–1848), American politician
 Doug Sewall, American wheelchair curler
 George P. Sewall (1811–1881), American lawyer and State Representative from Old Town, Maine
 Gilbert T. Sewall (born 1946), American educator and author
 Harold M. Sewall (1860–1924), American politician and diplomat
 Harriet Winslow Sewall (1819–1889), American poet
 Jonathan Sewall  (1729–1796), last British attorney general of Massachusetts
 Joseph Sewall (1921–2011), American businessman and politician from Maine
 May Wright Sewall (1844–1920), American feminist, educator, and lecturer
 Richard B. Sewall (1908–2003), American professor of English at Yale University
 Samuel Sewall (1652–1730), American judge in Massachusetts
 Samuel Sewall (congressman) (1757–1814), American lawyer and congressman
 Samuel Edmund Sewall (1799-1888), American lawyer, abolitionist, and suffragist
 Sarah Sewall, American lecturer at Harvard Kennedy School
 Stephen Sewall (orientalist) (1734–1804), American professor at Harvard University
 Sumner Sewall (1897–1965), Governor of Maine and airline executive
 Thomas Sewall (1786–1845), American physician

See also

 Sewall, British Columbia
 Sewall's Point, Florida
 Sewell (disambiguation)
 Sewel (disambiguation)